Dr Jekyll and Mr Hyde is a British film adaptation of Robert Louis Stevenson's novella, directed by Maurice Phillips and starring John Hannah. Set in Victorian England, it was filmed in 2002 and released in Britain in that year. As the result of its release in the US in 2003, that date is sometimes attached to it.

Plot
Dr Henry Jekyll experiments with a serum on himself, with the result that he is transformed into an evil character who calls himself Edward Hyde. Jekyll does not see that Hyde is a version of himself and develops a multiple personality disorder. After murdering women, Hyde frames Jekyll, who wishes to give himself up to the police, but Hyde intervenes, knowing that if Jekyll is hanged, Hyde will die too. Jekyll then kills himself.

Production
The film was produced by John Hannah for his company Clerkenwell Films. It was filmed in Lithuania in 2002, and a number of Scottish actors gave the film a Scottish flavour. Originally intended for television, it was released on DVD in 2004.

Cast
 John Hannah as Dr. Henry Jekyll and Mr. Edward Hyde
 David Warner as Sir Danvers Carew
 Gerard Horan as John Utterson
 Kellie Shirley as Mabel Mercer
 Jack Blumenau as Ned Chandler
 Brian Pettifer as Poole
 Janet Henfrey as Mrs. Robey 
 Ellie Haddington as Florrie Bradley
 Mel Martin as Rachel Carew
 John Rogan as Father Peter 
 Elodie Kendall as Sarah Carew
 Ifan Meredith as Dr. Arthur Lanyon
 Tilly Vosburgh as Mabel's Mother
 James Saxon as Dr. Johnson
 Christopher Good as Dr. Brown
 Marius Jampolskis as Boy With Note
 Lina Budzeikaite as Bruised Woman

Notes

External links 
 
 Dr Jekyll and Mr Hyde at YouTube 

2003 films
2003 horror films
Dr. Jekyll and Mr. Hyde films
British science fiction horror films
2000s English-language films
2000s monster movies
2000s British films